Colchani (Potosí) is a small town in Bolivia. In 2009 it had an estimated population of 611.

References

Populated places in Potosí Department